Diervilla, or bush honeysuckle, is a genus of three species of deciduous shrubs in the family Caprifoliaceae, all indigenous to eastern North America. The genus is named after a French surgeon Dr. Marin Diereville, who introduced the plant to Europe around 1700.

The bush honeysuckles are low in height, of small to medium diameter, and develop into colonies by means of spreading underground rhizomes. Their leaves are simple, opposite and either oval or lanceolate in shape with a toothed edge. The fall color varies between yellow, orange and red. Small tubular flowers, typically pale yellow, are produced in June and July.

Species

Other species formerly included in Diervilla are now treated in the genus Weigela. The bush honeysuckles are commonly confused with the common wild honeysuckle (Lonicera tatarica), or the Japanese honeysuckle (Lonicera japonica), both members of the closely related genus Lonicera.

The British Diervilla national  collection is held at Sheffield Botanical Gardens; along with the national collection of the closely related genus Weigela.

Diervilla species are used as food plants by the larvae of some Lepidoptera species including the common emerald and the engrailed moths.

References

External links
British national collection at Sheffield Botanical Gardens
USDA Plants Profile: Diervilla lonicera

Caprifoliaceae
Caprifoliaceae genera
Flora of Canada
Flora of the Eastern United States
Shrubs